The 2022–23 Men's FIH Pro League is the fourth edition of the Men's FIH Pro League, a field hockey championship for men's national teams. The tournament began in October 2022 and will finish in July 2023.

Format
The FIH has changed the format for this season as there will be no home and away matches and the season is divided into date blocks. To reduce financial and logistical issues, a set of three teams will gather at one venue and a "mini tournament" will be contested where each team will play two matches against one another. The changed format will also reduce the issue of travel time and will minimise the burden on players.

Point system and rankings
The winning team will get three points. In case of a draw, both team will be given one point, with the winner of the shootout earning an extra point. The team finishing last will be relagated to the Nations Cup.

Teams
Following their withdrawal in the 2021–22 season due to COVID-19 related travel requirements, the national teams of Australia and New Zealand will rejoin for the new season.

Squads

Results

Standings

Fixtures
All times are local.

Goalscorers

References

External links

FIH Pro League
FIH Pro League
FIH Pro League
FIH Pro League